Scouts' Day or Guides' Day is a generic term for special days observed by members of the Scouting movement throughout the year. Some of these days have religious significance, while others may be a simple celebration of Scouting. Typically, it is a day when all members of Scouting will re-affirm the Scout Promise.

Founders' Days
Worldwide in nearly all Scout associations, Founders' Day is celebrated on February 22, the birthday of Robert Baden-Powell, 1st Baron Baden-Powell (born in 1857), the founder of Scouting, and coincidentally also of his wife Olave Baden-Powell (born in 1889). In Kenya, the grave of Baden Powell has become a pilgrimage site, and each year, the members of the Kenya Scouts Association and Kenya Girl Guides Association celebrate Scouting at the grave.

Individual associations also celebrate their own founding on other dates, although these are generally restricted to "major" anniversaries, such as a decennial. Girl Scouts of the USA celebrate Founders Day on 31 October, the birthday of Juliette Gordon Low.

World Thinking Day

Thinking Day is celebrated on 22 February.
The World Association of Girl Guides and Girl Scouts (WAGGGS) chose the date as it was the birthday of Scouting and Guiding founder Robert Baden-Powell and of Olave Baden-Powell. It is thus celebrated by Girl Guides and Girl Scouts associations. SAGNOs (those associations which are part simultaneously of WAGGGS and WOSM) usually take part in it. It is also celebrated by some boy-oriented scout associations belonging to WOSM (i.e. Greece, where it is called Imera Skepseos),

Saint George's Day

Saint George is the patron saint of Scouting. The nearest Sunday to 23 April is observed as a celebration in some countries, for example, the United Kingdom, Portugal, Brazil and Spain. After Founder's Day, it's the biggest celebration in National Scout Organizations.

In the UK many Scouting Districts celebrate the day with a parade of the groups and sections to a church or other suitable venue, often outdoors, where a service is held where the Scout sections all re-affirm their Scout Promises.

However, it is becoming more difficult to encourage participation by the youth membership, so many Districts forego the parade and church service in place of a more family oriented day. The focus of the day is still the affirmation of the Promise by all members.

Windsor and Queen Scouts
Each St. George's Day is also marked by a service in St. George's Chapel in Windsor Castle, which is open to all recipients of the Queen's Scout Award in the previous year.

Scout Sunday, Scout Jumuah, and Scout Sabbath (Boy Scouts of America)

The Boy Scouts of America have designated the Sunday preceding 8 February, or 8 February if it is a Sunday, as Scout Sunday, the following Friday as Scout Jumuah, and the following Saturday is designated as Scout Sabbath. The United Methodist Church and the Presbyterian Church (USA) celebrate Scout Sunday on the second Sunday of February as not to conflict with their Transfiguration Sunday.

The day is meant to mark the founding of the Scouts in the United States. Observation varies by unit and locale.  Scouts go to their places of worship in uniform and help with the service.

In the United States, Scouting has been used by churches, temples, synagogues, and many other religious organizations as part of their youth ministries. Approximately 50 percent of all Scouting units are chartered to religious groups. These observances offer an opportunity for congregations to honor Scouts and Scouters, as well as to learn more themselves about the value of Scouting as a youth program.

Girl Scout Week (Girl Scouts of the USA)
In the Girl Scouts of the USA, the equivalent holiday is Girl Scout Sunday or Girl Scout Sabbath, celebrated in Girl Scout Week the week that includes 12 March, the day the first Girl Scout troop was founded by Juliette Gordon Low in Savannah, Georgia in 1912.

Scout-Guide Week (Canada)
In Canada both the Guides and the Scouts celebrate Scout-Guide Week which is the week (Sunday-Sunday) in which 22 February falls (not including the first Sunday).  It is often used to have joint events between the two groups.

Africa Scout Day
Africa Scout Day is a day of celebration for Scouts in Africa and is held annually on 13 March. At the 62nd ordinary session of the Council of Ministers of the then OAU, (currently African Union) in Addis Ababa in 1995, a resolution was passed that Scouting in Africa must be recognized and as such 13 March would be celebrated as Africa Scout Day.

World Scout Day

World Scout Day, August 1st, commemorates the first Scout Camp on Brownsea Island in 1907.

On World Scout Day, also known as "Scout Scarf Day," all active and former scouts are encouraged to wear their scarfs, or neckerchiefs as a visible commemoration of Scouting.

Scout Service and Public Relationship Week (Sri Lanka)

Scout Service and Public Relationship Week is held annually on June–July. Scouts will call on the public during this week in uniform. The event began with the participation of Scouts from all 37 districts simultaneously numbering approximately 40,000 between the ages of 7 and 18. A Patrol consisting of four Scouts or more in uniform will carry an official card given by Sri Lanka Scout Association for public contributions. Scouts find money for their Scout Group through the Service and Relationship week each year. They go to houses and work places and help their owners with small work they can do. People give them work and then give some amount of money for their effort. The association requests the public to contribute to them generously as this is the main fund raising project for them.

Dates celebrated by country

See also

 Religion in Scouting
 Scout Law – A Scout is reverent.
 Scouting 2007 Centenary – celebrations for 100 years of Scouting

External links

Further reading

References

Scouting events
January observances
February observances
March observances
April observances
May observances
July observances
August observances
October observances